Intimidator is a steel roller coaster built by Bolliger & Mabillard at Carowinds in Charlotte, North Carolina. The roller coaster is located in the Celebration Plaza section of the park. Intimidator is the thirteenth roller coaster installed at Carowinds and is located on the site of the former Carowinds River Adventure near the entrance of the theme park. It was announced on August 26, 2009, and opened March 27, 2010. The roller coaster's name comes from the nickname of NASCAR driver Dale Earnhardt.

History
Construction on Intimidator began during the summer of 2009 with land clearing and footings being constructed. Track pieces first began to arrive at Carowinds on August 7, 2009. About three weeks later, on August 26, 2009, Carowinds officially announced Intimidator. Along with the announcement, Carowinds reached a licensing agreement with Dale Earnhardt, Inc. to use the late NASCAR racing legend Dale Earnhardt's brand as part of the ride. One of Earnhardt's sons, Kerry Earnhardt, was on-hand for the press conference announcing the attraction and endorsed the ride on behalf of the family.

The first supports and track for Intimidator were installed on September 1, 2009. The lift hill was erected on October 1, 2009, and was completed on October 13, 2009. In order to install the last lift piece, 3 cranes were required. Construction on the roller coaster layout continued through November and December with the final track piece installed on December 21, 2009. Construction on the station, mechanics, and landscaping of Intimidator took place during the months of January and February. On February 4, 2010, testing of Intimidator commenced. The ride ultimately cost $23 million.

On January 14, 2010, Carowinds launched a "First Rider Auction" in which people from anywhere in the world would bid to be one of Intimidator's first 96 public riders. The winners would ride the coaster on March 27, 2010, before it opened to general public; all money raised from the auction would go to the Dale Earnhardt Foundation. The highest bid for a single seat was US$500. The new roller coaster officially opened to the public on March 27, 2010. Intimidator was one of two roller coasters themed to Earnhardt that opened in 2010; the other was Intimidator 305, a giga coaster manufactured by Intamin at Kings Dominion, another Cedar Fair park. Carowinds officials hoped that the ride would attract guests.

Ride experience

Intimidator features eight drops, seven camelback hills, a panoramic U-turn, and a diving spiral.The seven camelback hills are intended to represent each of Earnhardt's championships. One cycle lasts about 3 minutes and 33 seconds. 

Before the train leaves the station, a short message is played, "Gentlemen, start your engines!" After departing from the station, the train heads straight to the chain lift hill. After the camelback hill, the train makes a sharp right hand turn back to the ground followed by a left hand turn. After the turn, the train goes over the second camelback hill. Following the hill, the train enters a  hammerhead turn. The train then goes over a third camelback hill, immediately followed by another camelback hill. Next, the train makes a left hand turn into the mid-course brake run which slows the train down. After the train exits the brake run, it goes over the fifth camelback and makes a sharp right hand turn into an element known as a Diving Spiral. The train goes through two more camelback hills before entering the final brake run which leads into the station.

Characteristics

Trains
Intimidator operates with three open-air stadium style steel and fiberglass trains. Each train has eight cars that have four seats each for a total of 32 riders per train. Additionally, the trains are themed after Dale Earnhardt’s 1998 RCR No. 3 Chevrolet Monte Carlo. The train bodies are colored red and black, with gray seats. The trains' restraint system consists of T-shaped lap bars.

Track
The steel track is painted red, while the supports are gray. The angle of the first descent is approximately 74 degrees. Also, the roller coaster includes trim brakes and magnetic brakes for speed control. In 2020, the track was repainted.

Awards

References

External links

 

Carowinds
Dale Earnhardt
Hypercoasters manufactured by Bolliger & Mabillard
Roller coasters in South Carolina
Roller coasters introduced in 2010
Roller coasters operated by Cedar Fair